John Poole (died 1601), of Capenhurst, Cheshire, was an English politician.

He was a Member (MP) of the Parliament of England for Liverpool in 1586.

References

16th-century births
1601 deaths
Members of the Parliament of England (pre-1707) for Liverpool
People from Cheshire
English MPs 1586–1587